Space Launch Complex 3 (SLC-3) is a launch site at Vandenberg Space Force Base that consists of two separate launch pads. SLC-3E (East) is currently used by the Atlas V launch vehicle, while SLC-3W (West) has been demolished.

Launches from Vandenberg fly southward, allowing payloads to be placed in high-inclination orbits such as polar or Sun-synchronous orbit, which allow full global coverage on a regular basis and are often used for weather, Earth observation, and reconnaissance satellites. These orbits are difficult to reach from Cape Canaveral Space Force Station, where launches must fly eastward due to major population centers to both the north and south of Kennedy Space Center. Avoiding these would require hugely inefficient maneuvering, greatly reducing payload capacity.

SLC-3E was the launch site of the Mars lander InSight in May 2018.

SLC-3E

History
One of two Atlas-Agena pads at VAFB, SLC-3E was originally the designated facility for MIDAS (Missile Defense Alarm System) launches and hosted its first flight on 12 July 1961. After the MIDAS program ended in 1966, SLC-3E then hosted reentry vehicle tests in 1967-68 as part of Project PRIME. The pad was mothballed for a decade, then returned to use in the late 1970s for NAVSTAR communications satellites on refurbished Atlas E/F missiles. On 19 December 1981, Atlas 76E crashed a few hundred feet from the pad after an engine failure, but no serious damage resulted to facilities. SLC-3E was then converted for the Atlas H (Atlas-Centaur core with a solid upper stage in place of the Centaur) and hosted ELINT satellite launches from 1983-87. The pad was mothballed once again and not used for the next 12 years, when it was revived for the Atlas IIAS.

Three successful Atlas IIAS missions were flown from SLC-3E. The first mission, flown on December 18, 1999, launched the Terra satellite. The other two launched satellites in the Naval Ocean Surveillance System, USA 160 and USA 173. The final Atlas IIAS mission from SLC-3E was launched on 2 December 2003.

It was reported in 2003 that SLC-3E would be overhauled to serve as a launch platform for the Atlas V. Renovations of SLC-3E began after a January 2004 ground breaking ceremony. In July 2004, Lockheed Martin announced the arrival of the fourth and final segment of the fixed launch platform (FLP). The largest segment weighed 90 tons and was "thought to be the biggest over-the-road shipment ever attempted cross-country." In February 2005, the activation team handed over the launch pad to the operational team, marking the end of major reconstruction. The first Atlas V launch from SLC-3E took place at 10:02 GMT on March 13, 2008.

United Launch Alliance (ULA) inherited the pad in December 2006 when the company was formed as the joint venture of Lockheed Martin and Boeing, and continued to use it to fly Atlas V rockets. In October 2015 ULA announced that the pad would be updated to accommodate the upcoming Vulcan rocket, with the pad then being able to launch either Atlas V or Vulcan. The final Atlas V launch from the pad took place on 10 November 2022, carrying the JPSS-2 satellite. The first flight of Vulcan from SLC-3E is anticipated to be in 2023.

Launch history (3E)

SLC-3W

SLC-3W was originally built for Atlas-Agena launches and the first flight off the pad was the launch of Samos 1 on October 11, 1960. The facility was extensively damaged 11 months later when Samos 3's booster exploded on the pad, but it was repaired quickly and hosted its next launch slightly under two months afterwards.

In 1962-63, the pad was converted for Thor-Agena use and was the primary launching site for Corona reconnaissance satellites for the next decade. After the Corona program ended in 1972, SLC-3W was converted back to support Atlases, this time flights of refurbished Atlas E/F missiles. The final such launch took place in 1995.

SpaceX initially planned to use SLC-3W for the Falcon 1 launch vehicle but switched to SLC-4E with Falcon 9.

Launch history (3W)

See also

References

External links
Historic American Engineering Record (HAER) documentation, filed under Napa and Alden Roads, Lompoc, Santa Barbara County, CA:

Vandenberg Space Force Base
Launch complexes of the United States Space Force
Buildings and structures in Santa Barbara County, California
Historic American Engineering Record in California
1960 establishments in California